Jean d'Espagnet (1564 – c. 1637) was a French Renaissance polymath. He was a lawyer and politician, a mathematician and alchemist, an antiquarian, poet and friend of French literati.

D'Espagnet was a counsellor in the Parlement of Bordeaux and its president from the years 1600 to 1611. In this position he was involved, with Pierre de Lancre, in witch-hunting in Labourd. D'Espagnet co-chaired De Lancre's 1609 repression, also congratulating his colleague on his job in the introduction to L'Incrédulité et mécréance du sortilège pleinement convaincues, besides condemning the Basque people, "this perverse people".

Jean D'Espagnet is known to have owned several books that had previously formed part of Montaigne's library, including his copy of De rerum natura, in which his signature overwrites that of Montaigne's on the title-page. In 1623 D'Espagnet wrote Arcanum Hermeticae philosophiae and Enchiridion physicae restitutae.

His son Étienne d'Espagnet utilised his father's library and designed optics for astronomy.

Notes

External links
Galileo Project page
 
 

1564 births
1630s deaths
16th-century French physicians
17th-century French physicians
17th-century French writers
17th-century French male writers
16th-century French lawyers
French male non-fiction writers
French occult writers
Witch hunters
Witch trials in France
17th-century French lawyers